In Greek mythology, Dotus (Ancient Greek: Νεώνου) was the eponym of Dotium in Thessaly. He was the son of Neonus, son of Hellen, son of Deucalion.

Note

References 

 Stephanus of Byzantium, Stephani Byzantii Ethnicorum quae supersunt, edited by August Meineike (1790-1870), published 1849. A few entries from this important ancient handbook of place names have been translated by Brady Kiesling. Online version at the Topos Text Project.

Thessalian characters in Greek mythology